Hama is a city in west-central Syria, previously known as Hamath.

Hama or Hamath (or variants) may refer to:

Places

In the Middle East
In alphabetical order, by complete name.
Al-Hamah, a village in Rif Dimashq Governorate, Syria
Al-Hamma, Tiberias, a depopulated Palestinian Arab village
Hamat Gader, hot springs and archaeological site at the site of Al-Hamma
Emmaus, town mentioned in the New Testament; name derived from Hamma or Hammat
Hamat, a village in Lebanon
Hamat Tiberias, archaeological site at ancient town, Israel
Hamath-zobah, ancient place or kingdom in Aram
Mevo Hama, Israeli settlement in the Golan Heights
Tell el-Hammeh, tell on the West Bank
Tell Hammeh, tell in Jordan

North Africa
El Hamma, town in Tunisia
El Hamma, Khenchela, town in Algeria
El Hamma District, Algeria
Hamma, Algeria - town and commune

Other places
 Abbotsham, English village, recorded in the Domesday Book as Hama

People 
Hama (queen), ancient Assyrian queen
Hama (Yuan dynasty), government official
Chisaki Hama (born 1988), a Japanese model, actress, and singer
Fumie Hama (born 1939), Japanese speed skater
Larry Hama (born 1949), an American writer, artist, actor and musician
, Japanese footballer
, Japanese footballer

Fictional characters 
Háma, a warrior in Germanic heroic poetry and legends
Hama, a character in Avatar: The Last Airbender (season 3) episode 48
Hama, a character in Kousoku Sentai Turboranger
Háma, Captain of King Théoden's Guard in J.R.R. Tolkien's novel The Two Towers.

Science and technology
Human anti-mouse antibody (HAMA)
Apache Hama, a software project

Other uses
Hama (company), a German manufacturer
Hama Yumi, a sacred bow used in 1103 CE in Japan
Hindu Adoptions and Maintenance Act (1956) (HAMA)

See also
Battle of Hamath, or Battle of Hama
Hamas, a Palestinian Sunni-Islamist fundamentalist organization

Japanese-language surnames